Mount Lowman is a mountain,  high, on the east-central slopes of Pomerantz Tableland,  southeast of Rinehart Peak, in the Usarp Mountains of Antarctica. It was mapped by the United States Geological Survey from surveys and U.S. Navy air photos, 1960–62, and was named by the Advisory Committee on Antarctic Names for Henry R. Lowman III, a United States Antarctic Research Program biologist at McMurdo Station, 1967–68.

References

Mountains of Victoria Land
Pennell Coast